The Yamaha XT 200 is a single-cylinder four-stroke Dual Sport motorcycle produced by the Yamaha Motor Corporation starting in 1980 through 1986. It is powered by a single-cylinder,  air-cooled engine. The motorcycle was sold with street parts installed such as mirrors, a horn, high/low-beam headlight, tail/brake light, and front and rear turn signals. The motorcycle runs on a 6-volt system.

The XT line of motorcycles was introduced in 1976. "XT" is an abbreviation for "Cross Trail".
Closely related to the XT200 are the XT125 and XT250 motocycles

References

XT200 top speed 76mph also 5 and 6 speed transmissions used